Pizzo Barone (2,864 m) is a mountain of the Lepontine Alps in Switzerland. It is located south of Pizzo Campo Tencia and is the highest summit of the Valle Verzasca in the canton of Ticino. From Sonogno a trail leads to the summit.

South of the peak is a small lake (2,391 m) named Lago Barone.

References

External links
 Pizzo Barone on Hikr

Mountains of the Alps
Mountains of Ticino
Lepontine Alps
Mountains of Switzerland